Genesis Archive 1967–75 is a box set by the English progressive rock band Genesis, released in June 1998 on Virgin Records in the United Kingdom and by Atlantic Records in the United States. After the release of their studio album Calling All Stations in 1997, the band assembled recordings from their history for release which involved the participation of former members Peter Gabriel, Anthony Phillips, Steve Hackett, and Phil Collins. The set includes previously unreleased studio, live, and demo tracks, some of which include re-recorded vocal and guitar parts from Gabriel and Hackett, respectively.

Genesis Archive 1967–75 reached No. 35 in the UK.

Background
Discs one and two contain the first official live release of a full concert from the band's 1974–1975 tour of The Lamb Lies Down on Broadway (1974). It was recorded on 24 January 1975 at the Shrine Auditorium in Los Angeles, and the only one of the tour's 102 dates to be recorded in multi-track. It is one of a collection of tracks on the box set with newly recorded vocals from Gabriel and guitar parts from Hackett, partly due to the difficulty Gabriel had as his more elaborate costumes often muffled his voice. "It." is a re-worked studio version with new vocals based on the live recording, as the recording used as a source for the release had ended early due to the recorder at the concert having run out of tape, however the song actually played at the show appears on the As Though Emerald City bootleg, released in 1975 by The Amazing Kornyfone Record Label.
 
Discs three and four contain previously unreleased live tracks from 1973, demos, single edits, and a BBC radio session from 1970, the latter featuring the band's early drummers John Silver and John Mayhew. The set is packaged with an 80-page booklet and extensive liner notes.

To promote the release, Banks, Gabriel, Rutherford, Phillips, Silver, Collins, and Hackett gathered at Heathrow Business Centre on 11 May 1998 for a photograph shoot and interviews. Only original drummer Chris Stewart and Mayhew, Silver's replacement, were missing from the event.

Track listing
All songs written by Tony Banks, Phil Collins, Peter Gabriel, Steve Hackett, and Mike Rutherford, except where noted.

Personnel
Peter Gabriel - lead vocals, backing vocals, flute, percussion, drums ("Patricia")
Tony Banks - piano, organ, electric piano, Mellotron, synthesizer, 12-string guitar, backing vocals, 2nd lead vocal ("Shepherd")
Mike Rutherford - bass guitar, 12-string guitar, bass pedals, backing vocals
Steve Hackett - lead guitar (Discs 1–3)
Phil Collins - drums, percussion, vocals (Discs 1–3), lead vocals ("More Fool Me")
Anthony Phillips - guitars, backing vocals (Disc 4), 2nd lead vocal ("Let Us Now Make Love")
John Mayhew - drums (Disc 4, tracks 3–6)
John Silver - drums (Disc 4, tracks 1, 7, 8, 12), biscuit tin (Disc 4, track 12)
Note: Not all credits for drums are listed in the booklet for Disc 4. On "Patricia" they are played by Peter Gabriel. On "Hey!" they are uncredited, possibly mistakenly. Original drummer Chris Stewart is named in the booklet but is not credited with playing on any tracks.

References

1998 compilation albums
Genesis (band) compilation albums
Virgin Records compilation albums
Atlantic Records compilation albums
Albums produced by Nick Davis (record producer)